Mali Dol is a small settlement northeast of Komen in the Littoral region of Slovenia.

References

External links
Mali Dol on Geopedia

Populated places in the Municipality of Komen